Iva is an unincorporated community in Jefferson Township, Pike County, in the U.S. state of Indiana.

History
A post office was established at Iva in 1893, and remained in operation until it was discontinued in 1901.

Geography

References

Unincorporated communities in Pike County, Indiana
Unincorporated communities in Indiana